Syllis is a genus of marine bioluminescent polychaete worms.

References

Polychaete genera
Bioluminescent annelids
Syllidae